This is the list of the busiest airports in Mexico, according to the Mexican Secretariat of Communications and Transportation. The busiest airport is Mexico City International Airport in Mexico City. The top 10 includes the international airports of the beach resorts of Cancún, Los Cabos and Puerto Vallarta, and the large cities of Guadalajara and Monterrey.

In graph

Mexico's 50 busiest airports by passenger traffic (2020-2022)

Mexico's 50 busiest airports by passenger traffic (2010-2019)

Mexico's 10 busiest airports by international passenger traffic (2010-2022)

Mexico's 10 busiest airports by aircraft operations (2010-2022)

Mexico's 10 busiest airports by cargo traffic (2010-2022)

See also 
 List of airports in Mexico
 List of the busiest airports in North America
 List of the busiest airports in Latin America
 Transport in Mexico
 List of airports by ICAO code: M#MM - Mexico
 DAFIF
 Wikipedia: WikiProject Aviation/Airline destination lists: North America#Mexico

References

External links 
 Lists of airports in Mexico:
 Top 10 Busiest Airports in the World

Mex
Busiest